Aoun is a surname. Notable people with the surname include:

 Ahmed Oun (also spelled Aoun; born 1946), Libyan military officer
 Ali Aoun, Algerian politician
 Alain Aoun (born 1971), Lebanese politician 
 Christopher Aoun (born 1989), Lebanese-German cinematographer
 Ghada Aoun, Lebanese judge 
 Joseph Aoun, multiple people
 Laetitia Aoun (born 2001), Lebanese taekwondo practitioner
 Mario Aoun (born 1951), Lebanese politician
 Michel Aoun (born 1933), Lebanese politician and president of Lebanon
 Michel Aoun (bishop) (born 1959), Eparch in the Maronite Catholic Church
 Osama Al-Aoun (born 1986), Qatari football player
 Tobia Aoun (1803–1871), Lebanese Maronite Catholic bishop

Surnames of Arabic origin